Nychalakh (Nıçalaax) is a rural locality (a selo), the only inhabited locality, and the administrative center of Byyagnyrsky Rural Okrug of Allaikhovsky District in the Sakha Republic, Russia, located  from Chokurdakh, the administrative center of the district. Its population as of the 2010 Census was 117, of whom 60 were male and 57 female, down from 146 recorded during the 2002 Census.

References

Notes

Sources
Official website of the Sakha Republic. Registry of the Administrative-Territorial Divisions of the Sakha Republic. Allaikhovsky District. 

Rural localities in Allaikhovsky District